Wood white may refer to:

Delias aganippe, a Jezebel butterfly endemic to Australia
Leptidea sinapis, a butterfly endemic to Europe, Russia, the Caucasus, and parts of the Middle East
Leptosia, a genus of butterflies commonly called wood whites

Animal common name disambiguation pages